Alexei Makeyev (born 25 November 1991) is a Russian professional ice hockey player. He is currently playing with Avtomobilist Yekaterinburg of the Kontinental Hockey League (KHL).

Makeyev made his Kontinental Hockey League (KHL) debut playing with Avtomobilist Yekaterinburg during the 2012–13 KHL season.

References

External links

1991 births
Living people
Russian ice hockey forwards
Avtomobilist Yekaterinburg players
People from Novouralsk
HC Vityaz players
Sportspeople from Sverdlovsk Oblast